Khalilabad is a city and capital of Khalilabad County, in Razavi Khorasan Province, Iran. At the 2006 census, its population was 8,409, in 2,324 families.

The beautiful spa in Khalilabad is locally called "Germou", meaning warm water. Many tourists from other parts of the province visit it in summer. There are two language schools in the city. There is a jungle park in Khalilabad which is 3 kilometers long, accommodating nearly all who want to have a nice weekend out.

Historical sites, ancient artifacts and tourism

Beheshti Bathhouse 

Beheshti Bathhouse is a historical Public bathing related to the Pahlavi dynasty and is located in Khalilabad, Razavi Khorasan Province.

Yakhchāl of Geli 

The Yakhchāl of Geli is a historical Yakhchāl belongs to the Qajar dynasty and is located in Kalilabad, Razavi Khorasan Province in Iran.

Imamzadeh Hassan, Khalilabad 

Imamzadeh Hassan is a Imamzadeh belongs to the Qajar dynasty and is located in Khalilabad County, Razavi Khorasan Province in Iran.

Imamzadeh Qasem, Khalilabad 

Imamzadeh Qasem is a Imamzadeh in Khalilabad County, Razavi Khorasan Province in Iran.

Jameh Mosque of Khalilabad 

Jameh Mosque of Khalilabad dates back to the Pahlavi dynasty and is located in Khalilabad, Razavi Khorasan Province.

Khalilabad Hot Spring 

The Khalilabad Hot Spring is a Hot spring is located in Khalilabad County, Razavi Khorasan Province in Iran.

Kondor Ab anbars 

Kondor Ab anbars is two historical Ab anbars belongs to the first Pahlavi period and is located in Khalilabad County, Sheshtaraz District, Kondor village.

Kondor Castle 

Kondor Castle is a historical castle located in Khalilabad County in Razavi Khorasan Province, The longevity of this fortress dates back to the 5th to 7th centuries AH.

Bezanjerd Castle 

Bezanjerd Castle is a historical castle located in Bezanjerd in Razavi Khorasan Province, The longevity of this fortress dates back to the More than 200 years.

Qadamgah Hazrat Ali 

The Qadamgah Hazrat Ali is a historical place belongs to the Qajar dynasty and is located in Khalilabad County, Razavi Khorasan Province in Iran.

Gallery

References 

Populated places in Khalilabad County
Cities in Razavi Khorasan Province